Fernand Larochelle (1909 – January 5, 1978) was a farmer, business owner and political figure in Saskatchewan. He represented Shaunavon from 1964 to 1971 in the Legislative Assembly of Saskatchewan as a Liberal.

He was born in Black Lake, Quebec, later moved to Saskatchewan and was educated in Ponteix and in Gravelbourg. Larochelle farmed near Ponteix and also operated a garage and a trucking business. He served as government whip in the Saskatchewan assembly. Larochelle was a member of the town council for Ponteix, also serving as mayor, and was also a member of the Chamber of Commerce, of the Stock Growers Association, of the South-West Regional Hospital Council board of directors and of the local school board. He was defeated when he ran for reelection to the provincial assembly in 1971.

References 

1909 births
1978 deaths
People from Thetford Mines
People from Gravelbourg, Saskatchewan
Mayors of places in Saskatchewan
Saskatchewan Liberal Party MLAs
Fransaskois people
20th-century Canadian politicians
20th-century Canadian legislators